New Brighton Villa Football Club is a Welsh football team based in New Brighton in Flintshire, north-east Wales.  The team currently play in the North East Wales Football League Premier Division, which is at the fourth tier of the Welsh football league system.

History
The original New Brighton Villa, existed between 1987 and 1996, and competed in the Welsh National League (Wrexham Area) Premier Division before they folded. This current version of the club was founded in 1997 as New Brighton FC, before changing back to New Brighton Villa in 2008.

The club joined the newly formed North East Wales Football League in 2020 as a Premier Division club.

Honours
Welsh National League (Wrexham Area) Division One - Runners-up: 1992–93
Welsh National League (Wrexham Area) Division Two - Champions: 2004–05

External links
Club official website
Club official Twitter

References

Football clubs in Wales
North East Wales Football League clubs